Thiamazole, also known as methimazole, is a medication used to treat hyperthyroidism. This includes Graves disease, toxic multinodular goiter, and thyrotoxic crisis. It is taken by mouth. Full effects may take a few weeks to occur.

Common side effects include itchiness, hair loss, nausea, muscle pain, swelling, and abdominal pain. Severe side effects may include low blood cell counts, liver failure, and vasculitis. Use is not recommended during the first trimester of pregnancy due to the risk of congenital anomalies, but it may be used in the second trimester or third trimester. It may be used during breastfeeding. Those who developed significant side effects may also have problems with propylthiouracil. Thiamazole is a thioamide and works by decreasing the production of thyroid hormones.

Thiamazole was approved for medical use in the United States in 1950. It is on the World Health Organization's List of Essential Medicines. It is available as a generic medication. It is also available in Europe and Asia. In 2020, it was the 206th most commonly prescribed medication in the United States, with more than 2million prescriptions.

Medical uses

Thiamazole is a drug used to treat hyperthyroidism such as in Graves' disease, a condition that occurs when the thyroid gland begins to produce an excess of thyroid hormone. The drug may also be taken before thyroid surgery to lower thyroid hormone levels and minimize the effects of thyroid manipulation. Additionally, thiamazole is used in the veterinary setting to treat hyperthyroidism in cats.

Adverse effects
It is important to monitor any symptoms of fever or sore throat while taking thiamazole; this could indicate the development of agranulocytosis, an uncommon but severe side effect resulting from a drop in the white blood cell count (to be specific, neutropenia, a deficiency of neutrophils).  A complete blood count (CBC) with differential is performed to confirm the suspicion, in which case the drug is discontinued.  Administration of recombinant human granulocyte colony-stimulating factor (rhG-CSF) may increase recovery.

Other known side effects include:
skin rash 
itching 
abnormal hair loss 
upset stomach 
vomiting 
alter sense of taste or smell 
abnormal sensations (tingling, prickling, burning, tightness, and pulling) 
swelling 
joint and muscle pain 
drowsiness 
dizziness
decreased platelet count (thrombocytopenia)
aplasia cutis congenita (prenatal exposure)
 thyroid gland enlargement (prenatal exposure)
 choanal atresia (prenatal exposure during the first trimester of pregnancy)
acute pancreatitis

Interactions

Adverse effects may occur for individuals who:
Take anticoagulants ('blood thinners') such as warfarin (Coumadin), diabetes medications, digoxin (Lanoxin), theophylline (Theobid, Theo-Dur), and vitamins
Have ever had any blood disease, such as decreased white blood cells (leukopenia), decreased platelets (thrombocytopenia) or aplastic anemia, or liver disease (hepatitis, jaundice)

Mechanism of action
Thiamazole inhibits the enzyme thyroperoxidase, which normally acts in thyroid hormone synthesis by oxidizing the anion iodide (I−) to iodine (I2), hypoiodous acid (HOI), and enzyme linked hypoiodate (EOI), facilitating iodine's addition to tyrosine residues on the hormone precursor thyroglobulin, a necessary step in the synthesis of triiodothyronine (T3) and thyroxine (T4).

It does not inhibit the action of the sodium-dependent iodide transporter located on follicular cells' basolateral membranes. Inhibition of this step requires competitive inhibitors such as perchlorate and thiocyanate.

A study has shown that it modulates secretion of CXCL10.

Chemical properties
The imidazole derivative thiamazole is a white to matte brown crystalline powder with a characteristic odour. The boiling point is 280 °C (decomposition). Thiamazole is soluble in water, ethanol and chloroform, but hardly soluble in ether. Galenic preparations are injectable solutions and tablets.

Thiamazole acts as a free radical scavenger for radicals such as the hydroxyl radical (•OH) radical. It is used as free radical scavenger in organic chemistry.

Veterinary uses
Thiamazole is also indicated in cats to treat hyperthyroidism.

References

External links
 

Antithyroid drugs
Imidazoles
Wikipedia medicine articles ready to translate
Thioureas
Pfizer brands
World Health Organization essential medicines